Adriaan Jacobus "True Blue" Smit (born 28 April 1984) is a South African rugby union professional footballer.  He can operate in several positions in the back-line but usually plays as a fly-half or fullback.

Career

Smit currently represents Oyonnax in the French Top 14.

He signed a contract with French Top 14 side Oyonnax prior to the 2014–2015 season.

References

Living people
1984 births
South African rugby union players
Rugby union fullbacks
Rugby union fly-halves
Afrikaner people
People from Springs, Gauteng
Cheetahs (rugby union) players
Free State Cheetahs players
Pumas (Currie Cup) players
Leopards (rugby union) players
Falcons (rugby union) players
Griffons (rugby union) players
South African expatriate rugby union players
South African expatriate sportspeople in France
Expatriate rugby union players in France
Oyonnax Rugby players
Rugby union players from Gauteng